Brynmor "Bryn" Jones (14 February 1912 – 18 October 1985) was a Welsh professional footballer.

Club career

Early life and Wolves
Born in Penyard near Merthyr Tydfil, Jones played for a variety of clubs as a youth, including Merthyr Amateurs, Glenavon and Aberaman Athletic, before signing for Wolverhampton Wanderers in 1933 for a fee of £1,500. In five years for Wolves he played 163 league matches.

Arsenal
Jones's exploits for Wolves earned the attention of George Allison's Arsenal, who were looking for a replacement for Alex James'. Arsenal paid a then British record fee of £14,000 to take him to Highbury in August 1938.

Jones got off to a dream start for Arsenal, scoring on his debut against Portsmouth and then netting two more goals in the next three matches.

Jones served with the Royal Artillery during the Second World War, and was aged 34 when competitive football resumed. He made seven league appearances for Arsenal in 1947–48, in which Arsenal won the First Division Championship, but he did not play enough games to qualify for a medal.

Jones played and scored in Arsenal's triumphant 1948 Charity Shield match against Manchester United. With this being said he was still only a bit-part player in the 1948–49 season. Jones in all played 76 matches for Arsenal, scoring 8 goals altogether.  He went on to leave Arsenal to become a player-coach at Norwich City in 1949.

International career
During his time at Wolves Jones also won the first of his 17 caps for Wales, against Northern Ireland in 1935. His international career lasted between 1935 and 1948, as well as a further eight wartime internationals, the highlight being a 2–1 win over England in 1936 at Molineux.

Personal life
Jones was part of a famous footballing family; he was one of five brothers to play professional football, along with Shoni, Ivor, Emlyn and Bert.
In addition his nephews, Cliff, Bryn and Ken were also professional footballers.  After a spell coaching at Norwich City  from 1949 to 1951 he retired soon afterwards. Jones then ran a newsagents near Arsenal's Highbury ground. He died in October 1985.

Honours
Arsenal
 FA Charity Shield: 1938, 1948

References

1912 births
1985 deaths
Footballers from Merthyr Tydfil
Welsh footballers
Association football inside forwards
English Football League players
Wales international footballers
Wolverhampton Wanderers F.C. players
Arsenal F.C. players
Norwich City F.C. players
Aberaman Athletic F.C. players
Glenavon F.C. players
Wales amateur international footballers
Plymouth United F.C. players
British Army personnel of World War II
Royal Artillery personnel
Welsh military personnel